Samuel Dickson may refer to:

 Samuel Dickson (American politician) (1807–1858), United States Representative from New York
 Samuel Henry Dickson (1798–1872), American poet, physician, writer and educator
 Samuel Dickson (Australian politician) (1866–1955), member of the South Australian House of Assembly
 Samuel J. Dickson (1867–1964), chief of the Toronto Police Department
 Samuel Dickson (died 1850), Member of the UK Parliament for County Limerick, 1849–1850
 Samuel Auchmuty Dickson (1817–1870), Member of the UK Parliament for County Limerick, 1859–1865
 Sam Dickson (1887–1911), American mechanic
 Sam Dickson (rugby union) (born 1989), New Zealand rugby sevens player

See also
 Samuel Dixon (disambiguation)